Lawsuits against the devil (or Satan) have occurred in reality and in fiction.

Actual suits 
United States ex rel. Gerald Mayo v. Satan and His Staff was a 1971 case filed before the United States district court for the Western District of Pennsylvania in which Gerald Mayo alleged that "Satan has on numerous occasions caused plaintiff misery and unwarranted threats, against the will of plaintiff, that Satan has placed deliberate obstacles in his path and has caused plaintiff's downfall" and had therefore "deprived him of his constitutional rights". This is prohibited under several sections of the United States Code. Mayo filed in forma pauperis—that is, he asserted that he would not be able to afford the costs associated with his lawsuit and that they therefore should be waived. The Court refused the request to proceed in forma pauperis because the plaintiff had not included instructions for how the U.S. Marshal could serve process on Satan.

Fictional suits

Writing
John Milton's Paradise Lost.
Goethe's Faust.
"The Devil and Daniel Webster", a short story by Stephen Vincent Benét, is about a lawsuit in which a New Hampshire farmer who sells his soul to the Devil is defended at law by Daniel Webster.

Film
The Devil and Daniel Webster, a 1941 fantasy film adapted from Benét's short story.
Suing the Devil, a 2010 Christian thriller film about a man who sues the devil for $8 trillion.

See also 
 Devil's advocate
 Lawsuits against God

References